Marinomonas atlantica is a bacterium from the genus of Marinomonas which has been isolated from clams of the species Ruditapes decussatus.

References

External links
Type strain of Marinomonas atlantica at BacDive -  the Bacterial Diversity Metadatabase

Oceanospirillales
Bacteria described in 2016